César Espinoza (born 16 September 1974) is a Venezuelan former footballer. He played in one match for the Venezuela national football team in 1997. He was also part of Venezuela's squad for the 1997 Copa América tournament.

References

External links
 

1974 births
Living people
Venezuelan footballers
Venezuela international footballers
Place of birth missing (living people)
Association football goalkeepers
20th-century Venezuelan people
21st-century Venezuelan people